Tiberi is a patronymic surname of Italian origin from the personal name Tiberio. Notable people with this surname include:

 Andrea Tiberi (born 1985), Italian mountain bike racer
 Damien Tibéri (born 1985), French professional football player
 Frank Tiberi (born 1928), American bandleader
 Jean Tiberi (born 1935), French politician, former mayor of Paris
 Pat Tiberi (born 1962), American politician, former U.S. representative
 Thomas Tiberi (1919–1995), American politician
 Xavière Tiberi, spouse of Jean Tiberi

See also

References 

Italian-language surnames
Patronymic surnames